Started by the Mar Thoma Syrian Church, Kalyan in August 1992 as a part of its Social Welfare Scheme. At present the affairs of the School are managed by an independent registered Trust - Easow Mar Timotheos Memorial Welfare Centre, Kalyan registered under Societies Act MH/695 and Public Trust Act F-7365/TNA. The School is also registered with the Social Service Department of the Govt of Maharashtra vide R.C.I.Registration No.938 dated 19.9.2005. 
The School caters the educational needs and also, the development and rehabilitation of differently-abled children of all communities living in and around Kalyan. Started with only 4 children in 1992, at present school have more than 60 students accommodated at our new school building constructed at Goveli-Titwala on a plot which was leased out by the parent Church. The school was functioning at Mar Thoma Centre, Karnik Road, Kalyan (West). Majority of the children are from poor families who are not in a position to afford any fees or transport charges. At present the cost of running the school is met from donations by the members of the Church and well wishers.

Website : https://web.archive.org/web/20110703003523/http://emtmwckalyan.org/

School Administration 
School is managed by an independent committee consists of eminent personalities and experienced teachers with the active support of the parent church.

Curriculum 
Regular academic training is followed as per the prescribed syllabus. The School follows three C's concept, based on basic shapes and colours to attain Comprehension, Competency and Creativity. Three C's concept has been most effective in bettering their quality of life and help them to stand on their own and acquire independent means of livelihood.

What School Offers. 
Vocational Training in candle, agarbatti, envelope making, screen printing, card painting etc. is also imparted. Extra curricular activities such as Games and sports, preparing for Special Olympics, Yoga training, picnics, drawing competition, dancing, singing etc. are provided.

Future Plans 
To have a more meaningful and deeper involvement in the life of disabled children to stand on their feet, to the maximum possible extent and also with heavy demand for admission in the existing school and lack of space and other infrastructural facilities in the existing school we are now aiming to commence work on the second phase where we proposed all the infrastructural facilities, such as :- 
 Common Halls.
 Administrative Block.
 Special rooms for Doctors.
 Vocational Training Shops.
 Hostels.
 Play Ground.
 Staff Quarters.
 Transport facilities.
 Library
 Teaching Aids etc.

Mar Thoma Syrian Church